The 2009 Nürburgring Superbike World Championship round was the eleventh round of the 2009 Superbike World Championship season. It took place on the weekend of September 4–6, 2009, at the Nürburgring.

Results

Superbike race 1 classification
Race 1 was red flagged before the completion of the first lap, due to an accident at the second corner. John Hopkins and Makoto Tamada did not take part at the second start.

Superbike race 2 classification

Supersport race classification

References
 Superbike Race 1 (Archived 2009-09-16)
 Superbike Race 2
 Supersport Race

Nurburgring Round
Nurburgring
Sport in Rhineland-Palatinate